Adelaide of Auxerre (born between 865 and 870, died between 928 and 929) was a Duchess consort of Burgundy by marriage to Richard, Duke of Burgundy, and had the title Countess of Auxerre, possibly as ruling Count. 

She was the daughter of Conrad II, Duke of Transjurane Burgundy and his wife Waldrada of Worms.

In 888, she married Richard, Duke of Burgundy. Adelaide is called Countess of Auxerre between 888 and 921. Exactly why is not clarified. It has been suggested that this was because she was given the County of Auxerre as her dowry. It is possible that she was ruler of Auxerre.

Issue
 Rudolph of France, who married Emma of France, daughter of Robert I of France
 Hugh the Black
 Boson (895-935)
 Adelaide of Burgundy, married Reginar II, Count of Hainaut.
 Ermengarde of Burgundy (born c. 905 and died c. 945)

Notes

Duchesses of Burgundy
Women from the Carolingian Empire
Elder House of Welf
Counts of Auxerre
10th-century women rulers
10th-century French people
860s births
920s deaths
9th-century women rulers